Burgundy is a former region of France. The name was from various states that were sometime outside the current borders.

Places
Kingdom of Burgundy (intermittently 411–1378) a name given to various states located in or near Savoy in modern south-east France
Kingdom of the Burgundians (411–534), an early medieval state founded by the Burgundians
Lower Burgundy (879–933), also called the Kingdom of Provence, a kingdom formed from the breakup of the Carolingian Empire, 
Upper Burgundy (888–933), a kingdom formed of the breakup from the Carolingian Empire, corresponding largely to western Switzerland
Kingdom of Burgundy-Arles (933–late Middle Ages), a medieval state incorporated in 1033 into the Holy Roman Empire, formed from Upper and Lower Burgundy
County of Burgundy (982–1678), a medieval county of the Holy Roman Empire to the east of the Duchy of Burgundy
Duchy of Burgundy (1032–1477), a medieval appanage of the French crown between Savoy and the North Sea
Burgundian Netherlands (1384–1482), the parts of the Duchy of Burgundy that correspond Low Countries
Franche-Comté (1600s-2016), a former French province and région
Bourgogne-Franche-Comté (2016-present): current French region formed by the union of Burgundy and the Franche-Comté
SS State of Burgundy (never realized), also called the Order-State of Burgundy, a proposed state in Western Europe intended to be formed following a German victory in the Second World War

Other 
Burgundy wine
Burgundy (color)
Burgundy Records, a record label
Burgundy (stock market), an alternative stock exchange
Ron Burgundy, a fictional newscaster in the film Anchorman: The Legend of Ron Burgundy
"Burgundy", a 1999 song by Coal Chamber from their album Chamber Music
"Burgundy", a 2019 song by Chris Brown from his album Indigo
Eshon Burgundy

See also

 Bourgogne (disambiguation)
 Burgoyne (disambiguation)